Edward Bowen  (1858 – 1923) was a Welsh footballer. He was part of the Wales national football team between 1880 and 1883, playing 2 matches. He played his first match on 27 March 1880 against Scotland and his last match on 12 March 1883 against Scotland. At club level, he played for Druids.

See also
 List of Wales international footballers (alphabetical)

References

External links
 
 

1858 births
Welsh footballers
Wales international footballers
Druids F.C. players
Place of birth missing
Date of death missing
1923 deaths
Association football forwards